Jaworki  (Lemko: Явіркы) is a village in the administrative district of Gmina Szczawnica, within Nowy Targ County, Lesser Poland Voivodeship, in southern Poland. It was formerly part of the town of Szczawnica, but was made a separate village on 1 January 2008 (as was Szlachtowa). It includes the former villages of Biała Woda ("white water") and Czarna Woda ("black water").

The village used to constitute a part of Ruś Szlachtowska region, the westernmost area inhabited by Lemkos. Two other villages of this region Biała Woda and Czarna Woda are now part of the village Jaworki.

Gallery

References

Jaworki